Venâncio Aires is a city in the state of Rio Grande do Sul, Brazil. It is the capital of chimarrão, a kind of drink, with approximately 72,000 inhabitants.  The main industry is tobacco.

See also
Esporte Clube Guarani

References

Municipalities in Rio Grande do Sul